Anisoscelis caeruleipennis is a species of leaf-footed bug in the family Coreidae. It was first described by French entomologist Félix Édouard Guérin-Méneville in 1838. Its status as a member of genus Anisoscelis was disputed in 2014.

References

Insects described in 1838
caeruleipennis